Judie Barbara Alimonti (1960–2017) was a Canadian immunologist known for her research on the RVSV-ZEBOV Ebola vaccine.

In 1991, Alimonti received a Bachelor of Science degree in microbiology from the University of British Columbia. She later earned a PhD in immunology from the University of Manitoba.

Alimonti managed the Canadian testing of a human-grade Ebola vaccine at the National Microbiology Laboratory in Winnipeg, Manitoba. When Ebola research at the lab began to founder, Alimonti set up a Skunkworks project within the lab to continue the research. Alimonti was employed as a contract scientist at the lab and left their employment in 2015.

Alimonti died of cancer in December 2017 in Ottawa.

References

1960 births
2017 deaths
21st-century Canadian women scientists
Canadian immunologists
Ebola researchers
Women immunologists
20th-century Canadian scientists
20th-century Canadian women scientists
University of British Columbia alumni
University of Manitoba alumni
Deaths from cancer in Ontario